The Maritsa is a river that runs through the Balkans.

Maritsa may also refer to:

 Maritsa Municipality, a municipality in Plovdiv Province, Bulgaria
 FC Maritsa Plovdiv, Bulgarian football club from the city of Plovdiv founded in 1921
 Maritsa, Rhodes, a village on the Greek island of Rhodes
 Maritsa Peak, peak in the South Shetland Islands
 Maritsa Iztok Complex, an energy complex near Stara Zagora, Bulgaria
 Battle of Maritsa, battle that took place at the Maritsa River near the village of Chernomen on September 26, 1371
 "Shumi Maritsa", the Bulgarian national anthem from 1886 until 1944

See also
 Marica (disambiguation)
 Meriç (disambiguation)